Sean Nealis (born January 13, 1997) is an American professional soccer player who plays as a defender for the New York Red Bulls of Major League Soccer.

Career

Youth and college
Born in Massapequa, New York, Nealis began playing soccer at the age of seven. In his junior year of high school, he led the Massapequa Chiefs to a NYSPHSAA Class AA Championship. Nealis attended Hofstra University, where he was a member of the varsity soccer team for four years. During his senior season he was recognized as the Colonial Athletic Association Defensive Player of the Year. In 2018, Nealis played five games in the PDL with Westchester Flames.

He is the younger brother of former Georgetown Hoyas, Long Island Rough Riders and New York Cosmos defender, Jimmy Nealis. His older brother, Connor, played for Binghamton University. Nealis' younger brother, Dylan, was a member of the Georgetown Men's Soccer National Championship Team in 2019 and was drafted third overall by Inter Miami in the 2020 MLS SuperDraft.

New York Red Bulls
On January 11, 2019, Nealis was drafted in the second round of the 2019 MLS SuperDraft, by the New York Red Bulls. After a strong preseason with the club, Nealis signed an MLS contract on February 17. On February 27, 2019, Nealis made his professional and New York Red Bulls debut coming on in the second half for Aaron Long in 3–0 victory over Atlético Pantoja in the 2019 CONCACAF Champions League. A few days later, on March 2, 2019, Nealis made his league debut with the club, appearing in a 1–1 draw with Columbus Crew. On May 11, 2019, Nealis scored his first goal for the club in a 3–1 victory over FC Dallas.

Nealis became a regular starter for New York during the 2021 season. On August 25, 2021, he signed a 3 year contract extension, with an additional option year. On October 23, 2021, Nealis scored the winning goal for New York in a 2-1 victory over Columbus Crew.

Toward the end of the 2022 season, New York once again handed Nealis a contract extension through the 2026 season with an option for 2027.

Career statistics

References

External links
 

1997 births
Living people
Association football defenders
American soccer players
Hofstra Pride men's soccer players
New York Red Bulls draft picks
New York Red Bulls players
People from Massapequa, New York
Soccer players from New York (state)
Sportspeople from Nassau County, New York
USL League Two players
Westchester Flames players
New York Red Bulls II players
Major League Soccer players
USL Championship players